Trans Studios Samarinda is a theme park located within Dadi Mulya Village on Samarinda Ulu, Samarinda, Borneo, Indonesia. Construction of the theme park and the hotel started in 2012. It is the first Trans Studios theme park to be built in Borneo. The plans for the park were unveiled to the public when Trans Studios Makassar signed a tourism agreement on 22 October 2009. Trans Studios markets the park as a "family indoor theme park".

References

Amusement parks in Indonesia
East Kalimantan